Orb Sceptre Throne is the fourth fantasy novel by Canadian author Ian Cameron Esslemont set in the world of the Malazan Book of the Fallen, co-created with Esslemont's friend and colleague Steven Erikson.  Orb Sceptre Throne is the fourth of six novels by Esslemont to take place in the Malazan world.

References

2012 Canadian novels
High fantasy novels
Novels of the Malazan Empire
Canadian fantasy novels
2012 fantasy novels
Bantam Press books
Tor Books books